Şövkət Orduxanov Stadium is a multi-use stadium in Qusar, Azerbaijan. It is used mostly for football matches and is the home stadium of FC Sahdag Qusar. The stadium holds 5,000 people.

References

External links

Football venues in Azerbaijan